Kabir Hossain is a Bangladesh Nationalist Party politician and the former Member of Parliament of Rajshahi-5.

Career
Hossain was elected to parliament from Rajshahi-5 as a Bangladesh Nationalist Party candidate in 2001.

References

Bangladesh Nationalist Party politicians
Living people
8th Jatiya Sangsad members
Year of birth missing (living people)
5th Jatiya Sangsad members
7th Jatiya Sangsad members